James or Jim Grover may refer to:

 Jim Grover (martial arts), instructor in World War II combatives and defensive shooting tactics
 James R. Grover Jr. (1919–2012), U.S. Republican politician